The McMaster Marauders football team represents McMaster University based in Hamilton, Ontario, Canada. The team plays U Sports football in the Ontario University Athletics conference. The Marauders have been playing organized football since 1901 when they played their first exhibition game in the Canadian Intercollegiate Rugby Football Union. The team has appeared in four Vanier Cup games, winning one in 2011.

History
The earliest reference of the sport of football at McMaster was during a meeting on November 30, 1898, when the university's athletic association's debated about expanding into the sport of football. The association had reached a consensus two days later that the lateness of the season made it pointless to start the sport for that year. The university would form a football team in the following year.

The McMaster Marauder's football team played their first football game in an exhibition game against the University of Toronto Faculty of Dentistry in 1901, losing 1-0. The Marauders won their first game in an exhibition match against Royal Military College of Canada with a score of 17-5. The Marauders played their first regular season game in 1902, losing their first game to the University of Toronto in a one-game season. The Marauders would not win their first game until the following season, where they also made their first playoff appearance. The early football team at McMaster would not have a head coach until the end of World War I, with most of the coaching duties taken up by the team captains.

The Marauders had made 23 consecutive OUA post-season appearances, having missed the playoffs in the 1997 season and then again in 2021. During this period the Marauders have won all eight of their Yates Cup championships (awarded to the champion of the OUA conference), and advanced to the Vanier Cup semi-final eight times. The Vanier Cup semi-finals is played in two bowl game, the Mitchell Bowl (Churchill Bowl prior to 2003) and the Uteck Bowl (Atlantic Bowl prior to 2001). The Marauders football team have also made an appearance at the Churchill and Mitchell Bowls in 2000, 2001, 2003, 2012, 2014, and 2019. The Marauders have also appeared at the Atlantic and Uteck Bowls, in 1961, 1964, 1967, 2002 and 2011. Amongst these appearances the Marauders advanced to the Vanier Cup three times, in the 1967 Atlantic Bowl, the 2011 Uteck Bowl, and the 2012 and 2014 Mitchell Bowls.

The Marauders would make their first Vanier Cup appearance in 1967 at the 3rd Vanier Cup, going on to lose 10-9 to the Alberta Golden Bears. After a 44-year absence from the cup final the Marauders won their first (and only) U Sports championship at the 2011 47th Vanier Cup, beating Laval Rouge et Or 41-38 in overtime. In the following year the Marauders lost against Laval in the 48th Vanier Cup. In 2014, they lost 20-19 to the Montréal Carabins in the 50th Vanier Cup. In addition to the championships presently offered by U Sports and OUA, the Marauders had also been awarded a CCIFC championship in 1967, as well as several OIFC championship, in 1957, 1958, 1962, 1963 and 1964.

Season-by-season record
The following is the record of the McMaster Marauders football team since 2000:

National award winners
Hec Crighton Trophy: Phil Scarfone (1984), Kojo Aidoo (2000), Ben Chapdelaine (2001), Jesse Lumsden (2004), Kyle Quinlan (2012)
J. P. Metras Trophy: Ben D'Aguilar (2012)
Peter Gorman Trophy: Kojo Aidoo (1998), Daniel Vandervoort (2013)
Frank Tindall Trophy: Bernie Custis (1982), Greg Marshall (2000), Stefan Ptaszek (2012)

Records

The Marauders currently hold a number of Ontario University Athletics records, both in terms of the team, as well as individuals who had played for the Marauders. Current records held by the Marauders are:

Team records
Most points for in a season — 2003 season (424 points)
Most touchdowns in a season — 2004 season (49 touchdowns)
Most yards rushing in a season — 2003 season (2807 yards)
Most penalty yardage in a season — 2005 season (1170 yards)
Most yards passing in a game — 17 October 1981 vs. Waterloo Warriors (10 interceptions)
Most consecutive wins — 2011 season - 2012 season  (21 wins)

Individual records
Most touchdowns in a season: Jesse Lumsden, 2004 season (21 touchdowns)
Most touchdowns in a career: Jesse Lumsden, 2001-04 seasons (47 touchdowns)
Most field goals in a season: Michael Ray, 2003 season (22 field goals)
Most converts in a season: Michael Ray, 2004 season (48 conversions)
Most converts in a career: Michael Ray, 2001-04 seasons (148 conversions)
Most yards rushing in a season: Jesse Lumsden, 2004 season (1816 yards)
Most rushing touchdowns in a season: Jesse Lumsden, 2004 season (21 touchdowns)
Most rushing touchdowns in a career: Jesse Lumsden, 2001-04 seasons (46 touchdowns)
Longest rush: Jesse Lumsden, 11 September 2004 vs. Waterloo Warriors (108 yards)
Most rushing attempts in a game: Kyle Pyear, 28 September 2002 vs. Laurier Golden Hawks (39 attempted rushes)

McMaster Marauders in the CFL

As of the end of the 2022 CFL season, 11 former Marauders players are on CFL teams' rosters:
Declan Cross, Toronto Argonauts
Mike Daly, Hamilton Tiger-Cats
Fabion Foote, Toronto Argonauts
Noah Hallett, Winnipeg Blue Bombers
Tyson Middlemost, Calgary Stampeders
Tommy Nield, Toronto Argonauts
Enoch Penney-Laryea, Toronto Argonauts
Daniel Petermann, BC Lions
Jakub Szott, Ottawa Redblacks
Chris Van Zeyl, Hamilton Tiger-Cats
Danny Vandervoort, Edmonton Elks

In addition, former Marauders quarterback Marshall Ferguson is on the payroll of the Hamilton Tiger-Cats, not as a player, but as a broadcaster.

References

External links
 

 
U Sports football teams
Marauders
Canadian football in Hamilton, Ontario